Stefan von Bogdándy (* 11 September 1890 in Kolozsvár, Hungary, † 4 August 1933 in Berlin, Germany) was a Hungarian physician and physical chemist. He was a close collaborator of Michael Polanyi.

He was born in Kolozsvár, Hungary (now Cluj-Napoca, Romania), to a noble Hungarian, Roman Catholic family. His father Alexander (Sándor) von Bogdándy was a government official.

He studied medicine in Kolozsvár, and worked as a teaching assistant at the Physiological Institute of the University of Budapest early in his career. He moved to Berlin in the 1920s to work for Fritz Haber at the Kaiser Wilhelm Institute for Physical Chemistry and Electrochemistry. In Berlin he became a close collaborator of Michael Polanyi. Together with Polanyi, he "developed the highly-dilute flame techniques pioneered by the Haber and Zisch into a powerful tool for studying simple reaction rates through chemiluminescence."

While he was known as Bogdándy István in Hungarian, he used the German version of his name, Stefan (von) Bogdándy, in international contexts, as was common practice among Hungarians. In German and English, the family name is often spelled Bogdandy without the accent, and the given name is sometimes also spelled Stephan. The noble particle von is also sometimes omitted. He was the father of the metallurgist and industrial executive Ludwig von Bogdandy and the grandfather of the legal scholar Armin von Bogdandy.

References

Hungarian physical chemists
German physical chemists
Hungarian emigrants to Germany
Hungarian nobility
Hungarian Roman Catholics
Franz Joseph University alumni
Scientists from Cluj-Napoca
1890 births
Year of death missing
Hungarian physicians